Club Deportivo Alfaro is a Spanish football team based in Alfaro, in the autonomous community of La Rioja. Founded in 1922 it plays in Segunda División RFEF – Group 2, holding home matches at Estadio La Molineta, with a capacity of 4,000 seats.

History 
In the 2013-14 season the club finished 6th in the Tercera División, Group 16. The club finished 8th in the 2018-19 season in Tercera.

Season to season

6 seasons in Segunda División B
1 season in Segunda División RFEF
42 seasons in Tercera División
1 season in Tercera División RFEF

Notes

References

External links
Official website 
Futbolme team profile 

Football clubs in La Rioja (Spain)
Association football clubs established in 1922
1922 establishments in Spain